Third Church of Christ, Scientist may refer to:

In the United Kingdom
 Third Church of Christ, Scientist (Liverpool, England), on Listed buildings in Liverpool

In the United States
 Third Church of Christ, Scientist (Chicago, Illinois) is now Metropolitan Missionary Baptist Church
 Third Church of Christ, Scientist (Cleveland, Ohio)
 Third Church of Christ, Scientist (Washington, D.C.)

Christian Science churches